Khairpur Medical College is an 8th public medical institution located in the city of Khairpur, Sindh, Pakistan.

History 
The university began construction on Saturday, 29 December 2012. The first principal was Prof Dr. Mashoor Alam Shah. Dr. Mumtaz Ali Channa was the first Administrator. They started the mission to establish the college at an old ruined elementary college. Five staff were hired through LUMHS. College is Recognised By Pakistan Medical Commission on  21-02-2020

The first 100 medical students matriculated in 2015.  The college affiliated with Peoples University of Medical Health Sciences Nawabshah.

Leaders

Principals

Prof. Dr. Mashoor Alam Shah, 2012-2016
Prof. Dr. Asadullah Mahar, 2017–present

Vice principals

Prof. Dr. Allaudin Abro, 2015-2016
Prof. Dr. Nazar Hussain Shah, 2016–2018
Prof. Dr. Khush Mohammad Sohu, 2018–present

Facilities 

The college has 7 Departments, three at main building and four at clinical hospital side at civil hospital Khairpur. Each Department has its own lecture Hall, laboratory, Tutorials, demonstration room and seminar library equipped with all the modern teaching aids and multimedia. Khairpur Medical College has one girls hostel and a New Plan of construction has started at 28 acres at KTN plot .

Library
A well-equipped library along with audio-visual facilities for CD's, data projection system and internet facilities is available for use of students and staff.

Admissions
Khairpur Medical College first enrolled 100 students yearly. Enrollment later rose to 500 students.

Quality management  
The main features of the quality management policy are:

 Development and application of best and innovative teaching practices
 Appropriate provision for faculty and staff induction, training, motivation and development
 Obtain and respond to customer feedback through effective communication

Departments

Basic Sciences
 Anatomy
 Physiology
 Biochemistry
 Pharmacology 
 Pathology 
 Forensic Medicine 
 Community Medicine

Clinical Sciences
 Medicine
 Surgery
 Gynaecology
 Paediatrics
 Ophthalmology
 ENT
 Radiology
 Anesthesia
 Paediatrics Surgery
 Plastic Surgery
 Nephrology
 Orthopedics
 Cardiology
 Pulmonology
 Dermatology
 Psychiatry
 Obstetrics

Curriculum
First Professional Year - Part I and II:
Anatomy, Embryology and Histology
Human Physiology
Medical Biochemistry

Second Professional Year:
Forensic Medicine and Toxicology
General Pathology and Microbiology
Pharmacology and Therapeutics

Third Professional Year:
Community Medicine
Ophthalmology
Otorhinolaryngology (ENT)
Special Pathology

Fourth Professional Year:
Gynecology and Obstetrics
Medicine, Psychiatry and Dermatology
Pediatrics
Surgery, Orthopedics and Anesthesia

References

External links
 Official Khairpur Medical College Website
 The College of Physicians and Surgeons of Pakistan

Medical colleges in Sindh